Peter Iwers (born on 15 May 1975) is a Swedish musician and the current bass player of The Halo Effect. He was a member of Swedish heavy metal band In Flames from their 1999 album Colony, up until their 2016 album Battles, originally replacing Johan Larsson who departed after 1997's Whoracle. He was also the bassist for the band Cyhra with former In Flames bandmate Jesper Strömblad from 2017 to 2018.

His bass playing style has been influenced by Toto bassist Mike Porcaro, as well as Geddy Lee from Rush and John Myung of Dream Theater fame.

He has two daughters and one son.  His brother Anders is also a bass player, who plays for Tiamat and played for Avatarium (2014–2015) & Dark Tranquillity (2015–2021). Peter Iwers now brews beer at his brewery outside Gothenburg, Odd Island Brewing, together with the founder and co-owner Daniel Svensson, another former In Flames bandmate.

Before he joined in Flames, Iwers played in a band called Chameleon.

Guest bassist 
Psalms of Extinction by Pain (2007)
Immersion by Pendulum (2010)

References

External links 

1975 births
Living people
Musicians from Stockholm
Swedish heavy metal bass guitarists
21st-century bass guitarists
In Flames members